Deneisha Selena Blackwood (born 7 March 1997) is a Jamaican professional footballer who plays for GPSO 92 Issy of the second French division and the Jamaica national team.

College career
Predominantly a forward during her collegiate career, Blackwood played two years for NJCAA school Navarro College. She was a two-time All-American and ranked sixth in career goals with 36 at the time she left. In her sophomore season in 16, Blackwood scored 22 goals, the seventh-most in single season Navarro history. In 2017, Blackwood transferred to West Florida Argonauts and played a further two seasons. In 2017 she was named to the All-GSC second team.

Club career

Florida Krush
In 2018, Blackwood played for WPSL team Florida Krush, scoring four goals in three appearances.

Slavia Prague
In 2019, Blackwood signed with Slavia Prague of the Czech First Division and was mostly played as a left back. She appeared in nine league games and a further four UEFA Champions League games as Slavia won the league title and reached the round of 16 before losing to Arsenal.

Orlando Pride
On 8 September 2020, with the 2020 NWSL season dealing with significant disruption during the COVID-19 pandemic, Blackwood was one of seven players signed to a short-term contract with Orlando Pride in order to compete in the Fall Series following the team's decision to loan out 11 senior players to play regularly overseas. She made her debut on September 19, 2020 in the first fall series match, entering as a 64th minute substitute in a 0–0 draw with North Carolina Courage. She appeared in all four Fall Series matches for a combined 196 minutes before being released at the end of her short-term contract.

Houston Dash
On 26 January 2021, Blackwood signed for Houston Dash on a one-year contract with the option of an additional year.

International career
Blackwood represented Jamaica at the under-17 level in 2011.

She made her senior debut during the 2018 CONCACAF Women's Championship qualification. She was part of the Jamaica squad at the 2019 FIFA Women's World Cup in France. It was the first time a Caribbean nation had qualified for the women's tournament. She played every minute for Jamaica as the team was eliminated at the Group Stage after losing all three games against Brazil, Italy and Australia.

Career statistics

Club 
.

International goals 
 As of match played 5 February 2020. Jamaica score listed first, score column indicates score after each Blackwood goal.

Honors

Club
Slavia Prague
Czech First Division: 2019–20

References 

1997 births
Living people
Women's association football fullbacks
Women's association football midfielders
Women's association football forwards
Jamaican women's footballers
Sportspeople from Kingston, Jamaica
Jamaica women's international footballers
2019 FIFA Women's World Cup players
Pan American Games competitors for Jamaica
Footballers at the 2019 Pan American Games
College women's soccer players in the United States
Navarro Bulldogs soccer players
West Florida Argonauts women's soccer players
Jamaican expatriate women's footballers
Jamaican expatriate sportspeople in the United States
Expatriate women's soccer players in the United States
SK Slavia Praha (women) players
Expatriate women's footballers in the Czech Republic
Czech Women's First League players
Orlando Pride players
National Women's Soccer League players
Houston Dash players